Anna Kozak (born 22 June 1974) is a Belarusian sprinter.

Together with Natallia Salahub, Ilona Usovich and Sviatlana Usovich she won a silver medal in 4 x 400 metres relay at the 2004 IAAF World Indoor Championships. For the 2006 IAAF World Indoor Championships, the Belarusian team had substituted Svetlana Usovich with Yulyana Zhalniaruk, and won a bronze medal.

External links

1974 births
Living people
Belarusian female sprinters
Athletes (track and field) at the 1996 Summer Olympics
Athletes (track and field) at the 2000 Summer Olympics
Athletes (track and field) at the 2008 Summer Olympics
Olympic athletes of Belarus
European Athletics Championships medalists
World Athletics Indoor Championships medalists
Olympic female sprinters
People from Chashniki District
Sportspeople from Vitebsk Region